Alexandrov's soap bubble theorem is a mathematical theorem from geometric analysis that characterizes a sphere through the mean curvature. The theorem was proven in 1958 by Alexander Danilovich Alexandrov.  In his proof he introduced the method of moving planes, which was used after by many mathematicians successfully in geometric analysis.

Soap bubble theorem
Let  be a bounded connected domain with a boundary  that is of class  with a constant mean curvature, then  is a sphere.

Literature

References

Differential geometry